"For What You Dream Of" is a song by English electronic music duo Bedrock featuring singer Carol Leeming, credited by her stage name KYO. It was originally released in 1993 through Stress Records (part of the DMC group), but was re-released in 1996 after being featured in the film Trainspotting and its soundtrack album, Trainspotting: Music from the Motion Picture. Following its 1996 release, the song was a commercial success, staying at number one on the UK Dance Chart for two weeks, and additionally appearing on the country's national singles chart for three weeks, peaking at number 25.

Prior to its appearance in Trainspotting, the song was included in Sasha & John Digweed's 1994 mix album, Renaissance: The Mix Collection. The song was also remixed by Blue Amazon and Holy Trinity for its re-release.

Formats and track listings

Charts

See also
 List of UK Dance Singles Chart number ones of 1996

References

1993 debut singles
1993 songs
English electronic songs